Ronald Rutherford Elvidge (2 March 1923 – 30 March 2019) was a New Zealand rugby union player. A second five-eighth and centre, Elvidge represented Otago at a provincial level, and was a member of the New Zealand national side, the All Blacks, from 1946 to 1950. He played 19 matches for the All Blacks, of which seven were as captain, including nine internationals.

He worked as an obstetrician and gynaecologist. After the death of Wally Argus in 2016, Elvidge became the oldest living All Black.

Elvidge died in Auckland on 30 March 2019, aged 96.

Since 1946, his secondary school, John McGlashan College, have participated in their annual inter-house competition for the Elvidge Cup, named in his honour.

References

1923 births
2019 deaths
Rugby union players from Timaru
People educated at John McGlashan College
University of Otago alumni
New Zealand obstetricians
New Zealand gynaecologists
New Zealand rugby union players
New Zealand international rugby union players
Otago rugby union players
Rugby union centres